The Montevideo Waterworks Company, Ltd. was a British company, operating in Montevideo, Uruguay. Organized in 1879, its offices were at 61 Moorgate, London, England. The company was founded to take over a concession granted by the government of Uruguay for the construction of the necessary works for supplying the city with water derived from the Santa Lucía River. There were six settling reservoirs, nine sand filters, two reservoirs, and five distributing reservoirs. The company assets were sold to the Uruguayan government in 1948.

References

History of Montevideo
Water supply and sanitation in Uruguay
Defunct companies based in London
Renewable resource companies established in 1879
British companies disestablished in 1948
1879 establishments in Uruguay
1948 disestablishments in Uruguay
Renewable resource companies disestablished in 1948
British companies established in 1879